Devistan II is a mountain of the Garhwal Himalaya located in the Chamoli district of Uttarakhand, India. Devistan means land of Goddess. It is 81st joint highest located entirely within the Uttrakhand. Nanda Devi, is the highest mountain in this category. It stands on the western rim of the Nanda Devi Sanctuary. It lies 1 km North of Devistan I   and 7.5 km NNE of Devtoli  its nearest higher neighbor. Trisul   lies 10.6 km WSW and 9.2 km ENE lies Nanda Devi .

Climbing history
In the month of May and June 1979 the Brown University Expedition visited the Nanda Devi Sanctuary. The trek started from Reni to Dibrugheta. Base Camp was established in the Sanctuary. Two camps were established on the mountain,  Camp II in the saddle between  Devistan I and II.  Devistan I was climbed from the eastern slopes. Twenty-four members summited Devistan I and another party reached the summit of Devistan II. 
An American team climbed Devistan I and II led by T A Mutch in 1978.

Glaciers and rivers
Dakshini Rishi Glacier on the eastern side and Trisul Glacier on the western side. both these glacier drains into Rish Ganga. Rishi Ganga met with Dhauli Ganga near Rini. Later Dhauli ganga met with Alaknanda at Vishnu Pryag. Alaknanda River is one of the main tributaries of river Ganga that later joins Bhagirathi River the other main tributaries of river Ganga at Dev Pryag and became Ganga there after.

Neighboring peaks
neighboring peaks of Maiktoli: 
 Nanda Devi: 
 Trisul: 
 Devistan I: 
 Devtoli: 
 Maiktoli: 
 Tharkot:

See also

 List of Himalayan peaks of Uttarakhand

References

Mountains of Uttarakhand
Six-thousanders of the Himalayas
Geography of Chamoli district